Saurabh Naresh Netravalkar (born 16 October 1991) is an Indian-born American cricketer who has captained the United States team. He is a left-arm medium-fast bowler who represented the India under-19 team. He made his first-class debut for Mumbai in the 2013–14 Ranji Trophy on 22 December 2013. He made his List A debut on 27 February 2014, for Mumbai in the 2013–14 Vijay Hazare Trophy.

Early life
Netravalkar, a software engineer, is an alumnus of Sardar Patel Institute of Technology, Mumbai and Cornell University. He is working for Oracle.

Career

Junior Cricket
He represented India in 2010 U19 World Cup while playing for India U19. In the tournament he played along KL Rahul, Jaydev Unadkat and Mayank Agarwal etc who future played Indian senior team. While he played for Mumbai cricket team in Ranji trophy etc domestic tournaments. But later alleged lack of opportunities better chances in USA moved there. Players such as Unmukt Chand and others did same.

International cricket
In January 2018, he got selected in the United States national cricket team for the 2017–18 Regional Super50 tournament in the West Indies. In August 2018, he was named in the United States' squad for the 2018–19 ICC World Twenty20 Americas Qualifier tournament in Morrisville, North Carolina. In October 2018, USA Cricket appointed him as the captain of the United States team for the 2018–19 Regional Super50 tournament in the West Indies and the 2018 ICC World Cricket League Division Three tournament in Oman.

In February 2019, he became US's captain in Twenty20 International (T20I). He led them in a series against UAE. The matches were the first T20I fixtures to be played by the United States national team. He debuted in T20I in that series on 15 March 2019.

Further he USA cricket association announced him as their captain for Division 2 U19 World Cup, Namibia on April 2019. The US finished in the top four places in the tournament, therefore gaining One Day International (ODI) status. Netravalkar made his ODI debut for the United States on 27 April 2019, against Papua New Guinea, in the tournament's third-place playoff.

In June 2019, he got selected in a 30-man training squad for the United States cricket team, ahead of the Regional Finals of the 2018–19 ICC T20 World Cup Americas Qualifier tournament in Bermuda. The following month, he was one of twelve players to sign a three-month central contract with USA Cricket. In August 2019, his name was announced as the captain of the United States' team for the Regional Finals of the 2018–19 ICC T20 World Cup Americas Qualifier tournament.

In November 2019, he led US in the 2019–20 Regional Super50 tournament. Following to this he played and captained United States's in the 2019 United Arab Emirates Tri-Nation Series. In the opening match of the series, against the United Arab Emirates, he took five wickets for 32 runs. He became the first bowler for the United States to take a five-wicket haul in an ODI match. In September 2020, he was signed by the Golden State Grizzlies team for the 2021 Minor League Cricket season.

In October 2021, he played in 2021 ICC Men's T20 World Cup Americas Qualifier tournament in Antigua. In May 2022, he was part of the team which participated in round 12 and round 13 of the 2019–2023 ICC Cricket World Cup League 2 tournament. In the second match of the twelfth round, he became the USA's leading wicket-taker in limited overs cricket.

In June 2022, he played in 2022 ICC Men's T20 World Cup Global Qualifier B tournament in Zimbabwe. In the USA's second match of the tournament, against Singapore, he became the first bowler for the United States to take a five-wicket haul in a T20I match.

References

External links 

 

1991 births
Living people
American cricketers
United States One Day International cricketers
United States Twenty20 International cricketers
Indian cricketers
Mumbai cricketers
Cornell University alumni
Indian emigrants to the United States
American people of Marathi descent
American sportspeople of Indian descent
Guyana Amazon Warriors cricketers
Place of birth missing (living people)
Sardar Patel Institute of Technology alumni